The Diamond Fields Advertiser (DFA) is a daily newspaper published in Kimberley, South Africa, founded on 23 March 1878.

The early days

The earliest paper on the Diamond Fields was a weekly called the Diamond Field, published from 15 October 1870 at Pniel. It moved the following year first to Du Toit's Pan and then New Rush (later renamed Kimberley), and had a strongly anti-imperial view point. Another of the early papers was the pro-British Diamond News of R. W. Murray.

The Independent, owned by William Ling in 1876, was acquired by J. B. Robinson. By the late 1870s the success of the Independent had forced the Diamond Field to close, but with the Diamond Fields Advertiser then emerging as a third paper alongside the Diamond News and the Independent keeping local politicians on their toes in the turbulent years that followed.

During the Siege of Kimberley, the newspaper was the subject of a feud between Cecil Rhodes and garrison commander, Colonel Robert Kekewich. The local newspaper, which was under Rhodes' control, ignored the military censor and printed information that compromised the military. Kekewich obtained permission from his superior to place Rhodes under arrest if necessary.

Prominent journalists in Kimberley in the early years included R. W. Murray, and F. Y. St Leger, later founder of the Cape Times.

Editors of the DFA

1878 – 1884 Henry Tucker, secretary of the Kimberley mining board and one time Member of the Cape Parliament.
1884 – 1896 Robert Fisher Wilson, independent spirit and fearless writer. Went on to become editor of the Johannesburg Times.
1896 – 1898 Albert Cartwright. Went on to edit the SA News and the Johannesburg Times.
1898 – 1910 George AL Green, Rhodes's 'Prince of Journalists'. Went on to edit the Cape Argus.
1910 – 1923 Frank Ireland
1923 – 1932 Henry Lissant Collins
1932 – 1938 George A Simpson. Was one of Sol Plaatje's pallbearers at his funeral at the West End cemetery.

1938 – 1939 Hastings H Beck
1939 – 1942 A Harrington
1942 – 1949 Rex Hall. Later helped to establish South Africa's Iron and Steel Corporation.
1949 – 1959 David Brechin
1959 – 1962 Archie Atkinson
1962 – 1967 Conrad Lighton
1967 – 1977 Mike Lloyd
1977 – 1984 Graham Etherington
1985 – 1991 Anthony Ball
1991 – 1992 Charles Guild (acting)
1992 – 2002 Kevin Ritchie
2002 – present Johan du Plessis

DFA today

The Diamond Fields Advertiser, affectionately known to its readers as the DFA, outlived its rivals and has continued as a daily paper (although the Saturday edition was dropped in the late 1960s). Today it is a member of Independent News & Media.

Readership stood at 108,000 in 2015, mainly in Kimberley and the surrounding region, with a distribution of 9,161 copies in Q1 2015.

Distribution areas

Distribution figures

Readership figures

References

External links 
 DFA Online
 SAARF Website

Daily newspapers published in South Africa
Mass media in Kimberley, Northern Cape
Publications established in 1878